Coldstream is a town and civil parish in the Scottish Borders area of Scotland. A former burgh, Coldstream is the home of the Coldstream Guards, a regiment in the British Army.

Description 
Coldstream lies on the north bank of the River Tweed in Berwickshire, while Northumberland in England lies to the south bank, with Cornhill-on-Tweed the nearest village. At the 2001 census, the town had a population of 1,813, which was estimated to have risen to 2,050 by 2006. The parish, in 2001, had a population of 6,186.

History 

Coldstream is the location where Edward I of England invaded Scotland in 1296. In February 1316 during the Wars of Scottish Independence, Sir James Douglas defeated a numerically superior force of Gascon soldiery led by Edmond de Caillou at the Skaithmuir to the north of the town. In 1650 General George Monck founded the Coldstream Guards regiment (a part of the Guards Division, Foot Guards regiments of the British Army). It is one of two regiments of the Household Division that can trace its lineage to the New Model Army. Monck led the regiment to London, helping to enable the Restoration of King Charles II.

In the 18th and 19th centuries, Coldstream was a popular centre for runaway marriages, much like Gretna Green, as it lay on a major road (now the A697). A monument to Charles Marjoribanks (1794–1833), MP for Berwickshire, whose ancestral home was in nearby Lees, stands at the east end of the town, near the Coldstream Bridge. Alec Douglas-Home (1903–95), who served as Prime Minister of the United Kingdom from October 1963 to October 1964, is buried in Coldstream.

Notable buildings in the town include the marriage house, where weddings were conducted, The Hirsel, which is the family seat of the Earls of Home, and Coldstream Town Hall, which is used as a library and registration office.

Each year, during the first week of August, Coldstream hosts a traditional "Civic Week" where it includes historical aspects of the town's history such as the Torchlight procession and horse-rides to the Battle of Flodden battlefield.

Coldstream Priory
The Priory of St Mary was founded before 1166 by Earl Gospatrick of Dunbar. Never wealthy or powerful, the monastery nevertheless occurs frequently in the history of the border lands, being attacked several times by English armies. The monastery is the only one from the period where any charters survive thanks to the good sense of the prioress, having them copied. The house was used by both English & Scottish crowns to gather information on the other, thanks to its location, the prioress treading a tightrope to ensure the survival of the monastery. It became a favourite of Margaret Tudor, wife of James IV, Margaret using it several times during the troubled times of the Regency. After the Battle of Flodden, the prioress had all the bodies of the Scottish dead (apart from James IV’s, which was taken to England), brought to the monastery for decent burial - an event commemorated annually even today, by a procession & service, involving cutting a sod of grass from the battle field and it being carried back to Coldstream; since the priory is completely lost today, the sod is symbolically ‘buried’ on the Tweed Green. The last prioress signed away her community and it ceased to exist as a legal entity in 1621, although no new novices had been permitted since the 1560 Reform Parliament.  No reliable record of the number of nuns living in the house have survived.  Isabella Hoppringle (1460–1538) was the prioress of Coldstream from 1505 until her death. She was succeeded by her relative, Janet Pringle, the last ‘real’ prioress of the house.

Bughtrig House 

In February 2020, the Scottish Borders Council announced plans to build a museum at the family home of Vice-Admiral Bertram Home Ramsay, who masterminded Operation Dynamo, the evacuation of Dunkirk.  "A former garden store will be converted at Bughtrig House in Coldstream to create the museum in his honour," BBC News reported.

The Ba Green 
The border between Scotland and England runs down the middle of the River Tweed, however between the villages of Wark and Cornhill the Scottish border comes south of the river to enclose a small riverside meadow of approximately 2 to 3 acres (or about a hectare). This piece of land is known as the Ba Green. It is said locally that every year the men of Coldstream would play the men of Wark (south of the river) at ba, and the winning side would claim the Ba Green for their country. As Coldstream grew to have a larger population than Wark, the men of Coldstream always defeated those of Wark at the game, and so the land became a permanent part of Scotland.

See also
 Coldstream Bridge
 Coldstream F.C.
 List of places in the Scottish Borders
 List of places in Scotland
 Coldstream Cottage Hospital

References 

 
Towns in the Scottish Borders
Populated places on the River Tweed
Berwickshire
Parishes in Berwickshire
Burghs